Wellard, a fictional dog, was the longest-serving pet (1994–2008) in the British soap opera EastEnders.

Wellard may also refer to:
 Wellard, Western Australia, a suburb of Perth
 Wellard railway station in Perth
 Arthur Wellard (1902–1980), English cricketer
 Ricky Wellard (born 1988), English footballer
 Wellard II, a fictional dog in EastEnders from 2015